Paradeudorix petersi, the Peters' fairy playboy, is a butterfly in the family Lycaenidae. It is found in Guinea, Sierra Leone, Liberia, Ivory Coast and Ghana. The habitat consists of primary forests.

References

Butterflies described in 1956
Deudorigini